Barnau is a panchayat village in Balesar tehsil, in the Jodhpur district of the Indian state of  Rajasthan. It has a population of 1846, of which 912 are males and 934 female.

References 

Villages in Jodhpur district